Anacostia is a genus of snout moths. It was described by Jay C. Shaffer in 1968 and contains the species Anacostia tribulella. It is found in North America, including Virginia.

References

Anerastiini
Monotypic moth genera
Moths of North America
Pyralidae genera